Lillian Theresa Boutté (born August 6, 1949, New Orleans) is an American jazz singer. She is the older sister of jazz singer John Boutté.

Boutté sang in the Golden Voices Choir as a child and won a singing contest at age eleven. She received a bachelor's degree in music therapy at Xavier University of Louisiana and worked as a session musician in New Orleans, performing as a backup singer with Allen Toussaint, James Booker, Patti LaBelle, The Pointer Sisters, Neville Brothers, and Dr. John. From 1979 to 1983 she toured internationally with the musical One Mo' Time. She collaborated with the Olympia Brass Band on a gospel record in 1980 and recorded her first jazz album in 1982. During her tours of Europe she began recording with groups in Norway and Denmark and married , with whom she formed the ensemble Music Friends. She has performed frequently in New Orleans in addition to touring regularly in Europe, performing with Humphrey Lyttelton, the Barrelhouse Jazz Band, Chris Barber, Oscar Klein, the Maryland Jazz Band of Cologne, and Pee Wee Ellis.

Discography
 Music Is My Life (Timeless, 1985)
 I Sing Because I'm Happy (Timeless, 1985)
 A Fine Romance with Thomas L'Etienne (GHB, 1987)
 Lillian with Humphrey Lyttelton (Calligraph, 1988)
 Lipstick Traces with Christian Willisohn (Blues Beacon, 1991)
 The Gospel Book (Blues Beacon, 1993)
 The Jazz Book (Blues Beacon, 1994)
 But...Beautiful (Dinosaur Entertainment, 1996)
 Come Together with Christian Willisohn (Art by Heart, 1997)

References

Bibliography
"Lillian Boutté". The New Grove Dictionary of Jazz. 2nd edition, ed. Barry Kernfeld. 

American jazz singers
American women jazz singers
American women singers
Jazz musicians from New Orleans